The Arab Cup Under 17 is an international football competition organised by the Union of Arab Football Associations, contested by the national teams under 17 in the Arab World. The first edition was in 2011.

Winners

Successful national teams

Participating nations

 Red Border: Host nation.
 Blank: Did not enter.
 GS: Group Stage.

See also 
 Arab Nations Cup
 Arab U-20 Championship
 Arab U-15 Championship

References

External links 
  Under 17 Arab Cup Football - goalzz.com

 
Union of Arab Football Associations competitions
Under-17 association football